Double Exposure is an album by jazz cornetist Nat Adderley released on the Prestige label featuring performances by Adderley's Sextet with Bill Fender, George Duke, Walter Booker, King Errison, and Roy McCurdy with guest artists including Cannonball Adderley and Johnny "Guitar" Watson.

Reception
The Allmusic review awarded the album 2½ stars.

Track listing
All compositions by Nat Adderley except where noted.
 "Watermelon Man" (Herbie Hancock) – 3:37    
 "Go and Pass" – 4:20      
 "Quit It" (Miriam Makeba, Caiphus Semenya) – 3:46     
 "Conant 19" – 5:02      
 "Traffic" (Julian "Cannoball" Adderley) – 4:05      
 "In a Silent Way" (Joe Zawinul) – 5:20    
 "Song of the Valdez Diamond – 6:31

Personnel
Nat Adderley – cornet, vocals
George Duke – electric piano, piano, ARP synthesizer
Bill Fender – guitar 
Walter Booker – string bass
Roy McCurdy – drums 
King Errison – percussion
Cannonball Adderley – alto saxophone (tracks 4 & 5)
Johnny Watson – guitar solo (tracks 1 & 3), electric bass (track 5)
Hal Galper – piano (track 4)
Don Peake – rhythm guitar (tracks 1 & 3)
Allen DeRienzo, Snooky Young, Oscar Brashear – trumpet (track 1)
George Bohanon, Dick Hyde – trombone (track 1)
William Green, Jackie Kelso, Jay Migliori – saxophone, flute (track 1)
Jack Shulman, Gareth Nuttycombe, Alexander Neiman, Henry Roth, Williman Hymanson, Jerome Reisler, Nathan Gershman, Walter Rower – string section (tracks 2 & 6)
Stephanie Spruill, Jody Mathis, Billie Barnum – background singers (track 2)

References

1975 albums
Prestige Records albums
Nat Adderley albums
Cannonball Adderley albums